Dual specificity mitogen-activated protein kinase kinase 2 is an enzyme that in humans is encoded by the MAP2K2 gene. It is more commonly known as MEK2, but has many alternative names including CFC4, MKK2, MAPKK2 and PRKMK2.

Function 

The protein encoded by this gene is a dual specificity protein kinase that belongs to the MAP kinase kinase family. This kinase is known to play a critical role in mitogen growth factor signal transduction. It phosphorylates and thus activates MAPK1/ERK2 and MAPK3/ERK1.

The activation of this kinase itself is dependent on the Ser/Thr phosphorylation by MAP kinase kinase kinases.

The inhibition or degradation of this kinase is found to be involved in the pathogenesis of Yersinia and anthrax.

Interactions
MAP2K2 has been shown to interact with MAPK3 and ARAF.

References

Further reading

External links
  GeneReviews/NCBI/NIH/UW entry on Cardiofaciocutaneous Syndrome
 

EC 2.7.12